The fourth season of Dynasty, an American television series based on the 1980s prime time soap opera of the same name, premiered in the United States on The CW on May 7, 2021. The season is produced by CBS Television Studios, with Josh Reims as showrunner and executive producer alongside executive producers Josh Schwartz and Stephanie Savage. Dynasty was renewed for a fourth season on January 7, 2020, and for a fifth season on February 3, 2021.

Season four stars Elizabeth Gillies as Fallon Carrington, Grant Show as her father Blake Carrington, Daniella Alonso as Blake's wife Cristal, and Sam Underwood as Fallon's brother Adam Carrington, with Robert Christopher Riley as Michael Culhane; Sam Adegoke as Jeff Colby; Rafael de la Fuente as Sam Jones; Adam Huber as Liam Ridley; Alan Dale as Joseph Anders; Maddison Brown as Kirby; Michael Michele as Dominique Deveraux; and Elaine Hendrix as Alexis Carrington Colby. Notable recurring characters featured in season four include Wil Traval as Father Caleb Collins; Ashley Day as Colin McNaughton; and Eliza Bennett as Amanda Carrington.

Cast and characters

Main
 Elizabeth Gillies as Fallon Carrington, an heiress and businesswoman, daughter of billionaire Blake Carrington and his first wife, Alexis, and married to Liam
 Daniella Alonso as Cristal Jennings Carrington, Blake's third wife
 Elaine Hendrix as Alexis Carrington Colby, Blake's and Jeff's ex-wife, and Adam, Steven, Fallon and Amanda's mother
 Rafael de La Fuente as Samuel Josiah "Sammy Jo" Jones Carrington, nephew of Blake's second wife Celia, and Steven Carrington's ex-husband
 Sam Underwood as Adam Carrington, Blake and Alexis's eldest son, a doctor
 Michael Michele as Dominique Deveraux, Jeff and Monica's mother and Blake's half-sister
 Robert Christopher Riley as Michael Culhane, former Carrington chauffeur, now owner of the Atlantix soccer team
 Sam Adegoke as Jeff Colby, Dominique's son and Blake's nephew, a billionaire tech genius
 Maddison Brown as Kirby Anders, Joseph's daughter
 Adam Huber as Liam Ridley, a writer and Fallon's husband
 Alan Dale as Joseph Anders, the Carrington majordomo
 Grant Show as Blake Carrington, billionaire and the father of Adam, Fallon and Amanda by his first wife, Alexis

Recurring

 Wil Traval as Father Caleb Collins, the hospital chaplain and Cristal's lover
 Lachlan Buchanan as Ryan, a stripper Sam marries briefly, and then dates
 Ashley Day as Colin McNaughton, Fallon's college nemesis
 Luke Cook as Oliver Noble, Kirby's Australian ex-boyfriend, a photographer
 David Aron Damane as Leo Abbott, a shady contractor
 Kara Royster as Eva, Fallon's new assistant and protégé
 Eliza Bennett as Amanda Carrington, Alexis's secret daughter by Blake, a lawyer raised in Europe

Guest
 Sharon Lawrence as Laura Van Kirk, Liam's mother
 Ken Kirby as Evan Tate, brother of Fallon's late childhood friend Trixie
 Roxzane Mims as Lo Cox, Dominique's mother
 Christian Ochoa as Victor Diaz, a player on the Atlantix
 Brian Littrell as himself
 Coby Ryan McLaughlin as Deputy Commissioner Dawkins
 Wakeema Hollis as Monica Colby, Jeff's sister
 Kelsey Scott as Martina, Fallon's interim assistant
 Shannon Thornton as Mia, who becomes romantically entangled with both Jeff and Michael
 Jesse Henderson as Nash Martinez, a college friend of Liam's
 Daniel Di Tomasso as Fletcher Myers, a public relations consultant who is Sam's ex
 Corbin Bleu as Blaine, a client of La Mirage
 Laura Leighton as Corinne Simon, an SEC officer
 Kevin Kilner as Bill North, a Georgia senator 
 Stephanie Kurtzuba as Katy Lofflan, North's chief of staff
 Ramón De Ocampo as Nolan Jamison, a tech mogul and friend of Jeff's
 Daniela Lee as Jeanette, a Carrington maid
 NeNe Leakes as herself
 Grace Junot as Ellen, a board member at Fallon Unlimited 
 Geovanni Gopradi as Roberto "Beto" Flores, Cristal's brother
 Randy J. Goodwin as Brady Lloyd, Dominique's ex-husband

Episodes

Production

Development
Dynasty was renewed for a fourth season on January 7, 2020.

Production of the third season was suspended in March 2020 as a direct result of the COVID-19 pandemic, and the filming of only 20 of the 22 ordered episodes of the season had been completed at that time. It was later confirmed that the 20th episode of the season, "My Hangover's Arrived", would serve as the season three finale. Showrunner Josh Reims, hoping to use reworked versions of the two unproduced scripts to start the fourth season, said in May 2020 these episodes feature Fallon and Liam's wedding; Blake going to war with Alexis, Jeff and Adam; Sam's new relationship with Ryan; and the return of the Moldavians.

It was reported that if production resumed by late fall 2020, season four would be expected to premiere in spring 2021 or later, and The CW's president Mark Pedowitz announced that all of the network's series would be producing "our normal episodic counts" for the post-pandemic season which indicates a full season of 22-24 episodes. Production on the fourth season officially began on October 15, 2020. On November 5, 2020, Daniella Alonso revealed on a podcast that she was pregnant with her first child; she further verified her real-life pregnancy would not be affecting Cristal's storyline in any capacity, and she would go on maternity leave a week prior to production shutting down for winter hiatus.

On February 3, 2021, ahead of its fourth season premiere, The CW renewed the series for a fifth season.

On April 28, 2021, Variety announced Elizabeth Gillies would make her directorial debut during the season. Grant Show directed the sixteenth episode of the season. On September 10, 2021, Gillies made her directorial debut with the eighteenth episode of the season.

On June 3, 2021, showrunner Josh Reims described the fourth season as a "rollercoaster ride" for Cristal, "She and Blake have to figure out how to move forward in their marriage after both cheated; her brother Beto will pay a surprise visit, upending her life and bringing out the dark side of Cristal once more; and in her biggest challenge yet, she has to deal with a medical situation that becomes much worse than anyone expected..."

Casting
Alonso had previously been the third Cristal cast in as many seasons. In May 2020, Reims confirmed that she would be back for season four, saying "I kind of wanted to do this thing—which I still might do—where we pretend at the beginning of the season that we're getting another new Cristal. But I don't want to scare Daniella. She's so great in the role, and I'm so excited that she's coming back." In February 2021, the casting of Luke Cook as Oliver, Kirby's Australian ex-boyfriend, was announced. The casting of Kara Royster as Fallon's new assistant, Eva, was announced in May 2021. In June 2021, showrunner Josh Reims revealed that Geovanni Gopradi would return as Cristal's brother, Beto.<ref>{{cite web|url=https://tvline.com/2021/06/03/cruel-summer-spoilers-kate-kidnapping-ncis-los-angeles-callen/|title=Inside Line: Scoop on 'Cruel Summer, Dynasty, #OneChicago, Zoey's, Flash, NCIS: LA, Bold Type, Lucifer and More|website=TVLine|first=Matt Webb|last=Mitovich|date=June 3, 2021|access-date=September 18, 2021}}</ref> Michael Fairman also reported Laura Leighton's casting in the guest role of Corinne Simon, an SEC officer. Original cast member Dale's character Anders was killed off in the August 2021 episode  "Go Rescue Someone Else", but the actor continues to appear on the series as a fantasy of other characters. The casting of Eliza Bennett as Alexis's secret daughter by Blake, Amanda Carrington, was announced in August 2021. NeNe Leakes appeared as a version of herself in the August 2021 episode "The British Are Coming".

Broadcast
The fourth season of Dynasty'' premiered on May 7, 2021.

The season is also scheduled to stream on Netflix starting October 22, 2021.

Reception

References

External links 
 
 

2021 American television seasons
Dynasty (2017 TV series) seasons
Television productions postponed due to the COVID-19 pandemic